Korean fabric arts are craft of making fabric and textiles produced by the people on the Korean Peninsula. They have a long history, which includes fabrics such as guksa, nobang, sha, jangmidan, Korean-made jacquard, brocade and satin. Or crafts such as the Korean quilts known as bojagi, Korean embroidery, Korean knots, Korean clothing and the rarer arts of Korean blinds weaving and Korean paper clothing. In old time, people usually wore natural dyeing clothes.

See also
List of Korean clothing

Korean art
Textile arts of Korea